Wheatables were baked snack crackers made by the Keebler Company (a subsidiary of the Kellogg Company).

They were available in Original Golden Wheat, Toasted Honey Wheat, as well as Wheatables Nut Crisps varieties in Roasted Almond and Toasted Pecan. A Seven Grain variety was also introduced but had previously been discontinued.

Wheatables were introduced in 1988 to give consumers a choice other than fried snacks. In 2003, Wheatables and the Susan G. Komen Foundation worked together on a breast cancer awareness campaign.

Wheatables were discontinued in July 2014.

Nutritional information
Serving size about 19 Crackers or 1.1 ounces

Nutrients
calories – 140 mg
protein – 2,000.00 mg
sugars – 5,000.00 mg
fat – 4,000.00 mg
carbohydrates – 22,000.00 mg
dietary fiber – 1,000.00 mg

Minerals
Sodium-320.00 mg

Vitamins

Fatty acids
Saturated fats – 1,000.00 mg

See also
 List of brand name snack foods

References

External links
Brand page

Brand name snack foods
Kellogg's brands
Products introduced in 1988